East Wittering is a large coastal village in the Chichester district of West Sussex, England. The majority of the village lies within the civil parish of East Wittering, while the western edge lies within the boundary of West Wittering civil parish.

History

There has been a settlement at East Wittering for over a thousand years. The Witterings were included in a grant of land to Bishop Wilfrid in the late 7th century. The Witterings together with Sidlesham were rated as 36 hides at the time of Edward the Confessor.

East Wittering is mentioned in the Domesday Book of 1096 within the ancient hundred of Somerley in Sussex, later part of the Hundred of Westringes (later Manhood). The ancient hundreds generally took their names from the location of their meetings; by the middle of the 12th century East Wittering was within the unified Hundred of 'la Manwode', i.e. 'the common wood'.

For centuries the manor of East Wittering was in the hands of the Wystryng family, who took their name from the place.

The former 12th-century Anglican parish Church of the Assumption of St Mary the Virgin, has been replaced by the more modern St Anne's Church.  St Anne's was built in the village centre during the 1950s, and the old church declared redundant in 1983.

In Victorian times the RNLI raised enough subscriptions to launch a distress boat from the beach at East Wittering, a role now covered by the Fire Service. Last century the area began to attract greater numbers of holiday makers but in May 1944 it became the landing beach for the 3rd Canadian Infantry Division during a dummy run for D-Day, code named Operation Fabius.

Since then it has returned to a quiet area with a small primary school, popular with week-end surfers. Nikolaus Pevsner described the village as "a jumble of bungalows and chalets near the beach in an untidy half grown up state". St Anne's Anglican Church was designed by architect Harry Sherwood who was surveyor of the fabric of Chichester Cathedral. The foundation stone was laid on 6 June 1958. The Bishop of Chichester consecrated the church on 14 May 1959. There is a plaque inside with the inscription:

This testifies  that East Wittering is one of the Thankful Villages – those very rare places that suffered no fatalities during the Great War of 1914–1918.

Surfing
The whole stretch of Bracklesham Bay is a popular one with many surfers. With a low beach gradient and the lack of any obvious dangers such as rips or obstacles it is a great beach for learners and with one of the UK's longest running surf clubs, Shore Surf Club.

Governance
An electoral ward of the same name exists. The ward includes surrounding areas. At the 2011 census it had a total ward population of 5,117.

Landmarks

 A war memorial on the eastern junction of the B2179 road and Cakeham road includes reference to East Wittering as a Thankful Village on the north west face.  This £25,000 memorial replaced an earlier smaller one from an unveiling ceremony led by Bishop of Horsham in September 2015.

Transport
East Wittering is most directly reached via the A286 road from Chichester to Birdham followed by the B2198 road to Bracklesham before taking the B2179 road.  Alternatively the B2179 can be taken in the opposite direction from Birdham for a slightly longer route via West Wittering.  The B2179 road skirts the centre of the village which lies on Cakeham Road.

East Wittering is served by a high frequency bus service from Chichester and Birdham passing alternatively clockwise and counter-clockwise round the Birdham, Bracklesham, East Wittering and West Wittering road loop formed by the B2198 and B2179 roads.

Notes

References

External links

Villages in West Sussex
Populated coastal places in West Sussex
Seaside resorts in England
Beaches of West Sussex
Chichester District